Elachista cynopa is a moth of the family Elachistidae. It is found in Australia in South Australia, Victoria, Tasmania, the Australian Capital Territory and New South Wales. The wingspan is 7.2-8.2 mm for males and 7.6-8.8 mm for females. The forewings are pale grey and the hindwings are grey. The larvae feed on Lepidosperma laterale. They mine the leaves of their host plant. The mine has the form of a somewhat swollen chamber near the leaf tip. Pupation takes place outside of the mine on a leaf of the host plant.

References

Moths described in 1897
cynopa
Moths of Australia